Michael "Mikey" Dickerson was the first administrator of the United States Digital Service. 

He left Google in 2013 to join the healthcare.gov rescue team. He has been named one of Fast Company's Most Creative People in Business and FedScoop 50's Disruptor of the Year. Dickerson graduated from Pomona College in 2001 and received an honorary doctorate from the college in 2015.

References 

Google people
Living people
Year of birth missing (living people)
Pomona College alumni